Woodbridge School is an independent school in Woodbridge, Suffolk, England, founded in 1577, for the poor of Woodbridge. It was later supported by the Seckford Foundation. Woodbridge School has been co-educational since September 1974.

History
The school was founded in 1577; however, like so many others, it lapsed during the Civil War. In 1662 Robert Marryott, known as ‘the great eater’, hosted a feast for local worthies in Woodbridge which started at the Crown Hotel and finished at the King’s Head in Woodbridge. From this feast came the reincarnation of the school which today enjoys the curious claim of being the only independent school in the country to have been founded in two public houses.

The Free School, Woodbridge, was an expression of the new confidence in England following the restoration of the monarchy in 1660. Local citizens contributed to the founding of the school in 1662, appointing a schoolmaster on an annual salary of £25 to teach, without charge, ten ‘sons of the meaner sort of the inhabitants of the town’. Additional pupils paid an annual fee of £1.

After a difficult start, including the ravages of the plague in 1666, the School flourished and enjoyed a glorious era in the eighteenth century when the East Anglian gentry enrolled their sons in great numbers. By the mid-nineteenth century, the cramped School building was proving inadequate and in 1861 the school integrated with the Seckford Trust, an almshouse charity, becoming a part beneficiary of an endowment left to the town of Woodbridge in 1587 by Thomas Seckford, Master of the Court of Requests to Queen Elizabeth I.

In 1974 the school became fully co-educational and today has 725 pupils.

The school
The school is a co-educational day school with a boarding component. It offers GCSE, IGCSE and AS/A Level examinations.  The day pupil body is divided into four houses, Annott, Burwell, Seckford and Willard. There is a boarding house known as School House for pupils in Year 7 to 13. The school's music activities include a symphony orchestra, chamber orchestra and choral society as well as smaller ensembles. Student musicians have been members of regional and national ensembles including the National Youth Choir of Great Britain. There is a professional theatre, the Seckford Theatre.

Sport
The school has playing fields including cricket squares, a heated sports dome with gym facilities, Astro turf for either tennis or hockey, an athletics track, rugby and hockey pitches.

Other sports include sailing (which takes place at Alton Water), riding, basketball, fencing, badminton, football, golf, netball, rowing, swimming, tennis, shooting, and windsurfing.

Friday afternoons
From Year 9 onwards, on a Friday afternoon, students have a choice of joining the Combined Cadet Force (CCF), (Army, Royal Navy or Royal Air Force sections), the Duke of Edinburgh’s Award scheme (or both) or honing their skills in the many different sports, arts, music, and other activities available at Woodbridge. Notably, Woodbridge is the leading school in the East of England for chess, being officially recognised as an English Chess Federation (ECF) centre of excellence and employs an International Master, Adam Hunt, as a full-time chess teacher.

Notable Old Woodbridgians

Malcolm Bowie – academic and master of Christ's College, Cambridge
Adam Buddle – botanist
David Canzini – political agent and advisor
Sophie Cookson – actress
Simon Dring –  British foreign correspondent
Edward du Cann – former Chairman of the Conservative Party and 1922 Committee
Blackerby Fairfax – physician 
Roderick Flower – pharmacologist
Robert Franklin – nonconformist minister
Wayne Garvie – director of content and production, BBC Worldwide
Nick Griffin – former MEP and leader of British National Party
Jack Laskey – actor
Francis Light – founder of the British colony of Penang
Desmond Longe – S.O.E agent and inspiration for James Bond, 007
Nick Lowe – rock musician and producer
Campbell MacKenzie-Richards – early aviator and test pilot
Jeremy Marchant Forde – biologist
David Miller – philosopher
Messenger Monsey – physician and humourist
Frank Morley – mathematician
Jessica Oyelowo – actress
Luke Roberts – actor
Camilla Rutherford – actress and model
Frank Ormond Soden – First World War pilot
Colin Stannard – archdeacon of Carlisle
John Stuck – cricketer
Isabella Summers – keyboardist of Florence and the Machine
Justin Tan – chess grandmaster
Andrew Taylor – crime novelist
Sir John Vigers Worthington – politician
Simon Wigg – speedway rider and five times world 'longtack' champion
William Wood, 1st Baron Hatherley – Liberal lord chancellor
Andrew Wolff – rugby sevens player

Notable staff
 Vincent Burrough Redstone, 2nd Master and Suffolk Historian, who suggested to Edith Pretty that the Sutton Hoo Ship-burial should be excavated. 
William Henry Balgarnie – inspiration for the character Mr Chips
Louise Rickard – rugby player
Michael Troughton – actor

Heads

References

https://www.gov.uk/government/people/victoria-busby

Literature
Weaver M & C (1987) The Seckford Foundation : Four Hundred Years of a Tudor Foundation The Seckford Foundation, Woodbridge.

External links
 Woodbridge School website
 BBC News League Tables Entry
 Profiles on the ISC website – The Abbey prep & Main School

1577 establishments in England
Boarding schools in Suffolk
Educational institutions established in the 1570s
Private schools in Suffolk
Member schools of the Headmasters' and Headmistresses' Conference
Sports venues in Suffolk
Woodbridge, Suffolk
Church of England private schools in the Diocese of St Edmundsbury and Ipswich